José Gregorio Alonso de Ortigosa (born 1720 in Viguera) was a Spanish clergyman and bishop for the Roman Catholic Archdiocese of Antequera, Oaxaca. He was ordained in 1775. He was appointed bishop in 1775. He died in 1797.

References 

1720 births
1797 deaths
Spanish Roman Catholic bishops
People from La Rioja